A Feud in the Kentucky Hills is a 1912 American silent drama film directed by  D. W. Griffith. The film, by the Biograph Company, was shot on the Hudson Palisades near Fort Lee, New Jersey when many early film studios in America's first motion picture industry were based there at the beginning of the 20th century. Additional filming took place in and around the Pike County town of Milford, Pennsylvania.

Cast
 Mary Pickford as The Daughter
 Charles Hill Mailes as The Father
 Kate Bruce as The Mother
 Walter Miller as A Brother
 Robert Harron as A Brother
 Jack Pickford as A Brother
 Henry B. Walthall as Psalm Singer
 Elmer Booth as Second Clan Member
 William J. Butler as First Clan Member
 Harry Carey as Second Clan Member
 Frank Evans as Second Clan Member
 Harry Hyde as First Clan Member
 J. Jiquel Lanoe as Second Clan Member
 Adolph Lestina as Second Clan Member
 Frank Opperman as Second Clan Member
 W. C. Robinson as Second Clan Member

See also
 List of American films of 1912
 Harry Carey filmography
 D. W. Griffith filmography

References

External links

1912 films
1912 short films
1912 drama films
Silent American drama films
American silent short films
American black-and-white films
Films directed by D. W. Griffith
Films shot in Fort Lee, New Jersey
1910s American films